John Elliot Burns (20 October 1858 – 24 January 1943) was an English trade unionist and politician, particularly associated with London politics and Battersea. He was a socialist and then a Liberal Member of Parliament and Minister. He was anti-alcohol and a keen sportsman. When the Liberal cabinet made a decision for war on 2 August 1914, he resigned and played no further role in politics. After retiring from politics, he developed an expertise in London history and coined the phrase "The Thames is liquid history".

Early life
Burns was born in London in 1858, the son of Alexander Burns, a Scottish fitter, growing up with his railwayman father in a house at 80 Grant Road, Battersea on what is now the Winstanley and York Road Estates. He attended a national school in Battersea until he was ten years old. He then had a succession of jobs until he was fourteen years old and started a seven-year apprenticeship to an engineer at Millbank and continued his education at night-schools. He read extensively, especially the works of Robert Owen, John Stuart Mill, Thomas Paine and William Cobbett. A French fellow-worker, Victor Delahaye, who had been present during the Paris Commune introduced him to socialist ideas, and Burns claimed that he was converted because he found the arguments of J. S. Mill against it to be insufficient. He began practising outdoor speaking, with the advantage of exceptional physical strength and a strong voice.

In 1878, he was arrested and held overnight for addressing an open-air demonstration on Clapham Common. He worked at his trade in various parts of England, having joined the Amalgamated Society of Engineers in 1879. In 1881 he formed a branch of the Social Democratic Federation (SDF) in Battersea. He worked on a ship, and went for a year to the West African coast at the mouth of the Niger as a foreman engineer for the United Africa Company. He disapproved of treatment of Africans and spent his earnings on a six months' tour to study political and economic conditions in France, Germany and Austria.

Radical politics

In 1884 Burns was elected to the Social Democratic Federation's executive council. At the Industrial Remuneration Conference of 1885 he  made some interventions that attracted attention.

He stood for Parliament in the 1885 General Election at Nottingham West but was unsuccessful. A year later, he took part in a London demonstration against unemployment which resulted in the West End riots when the windows of the Carlton Club and other London clubs were broken, where he encouraged rioters to loot bakeries. He was arrested and later acquitted at the Old Bailey of charges of conspiracy and sedition. He was arrested again the following year on 13 November 1887 for resisting police attempts to break up an unlicensed meeting in Trafalgar Square. The demonstration ended in the 'Bloody Sunday' clashes; Burns was imprisoned for six weeks.

In August 1889, Burns played a major part in the London Dock Strike. By this time he had left the SDF and, with fellow socialist Tom Mann, was focusing on trade union activity as a leader of the New Unionist movement. With other London radicals such as Ben Tillett, Will Crooks, Ben Cooper and John Benn, Burns ('The Man with the Red Flag') helped win the dispute. He was still working at his trade in Hoe's printing machine works and was an active member of the executive of the Amalgamated Engineers' Union.

In 1889, he became a Progressive member of the first London County Council for Battersea.  He was supported by his constituents, who subscribed an allowance of £2 a week. He devoted his efforts against private monopolies and introduced a motion in 1892 that all contracts for the County Council should be paid at trade union rates and carried out under trade union conditions. As a local politician, Burns is particularly noted for his role in the creation of Battersea's Latchmere Estate, the first municipal housing estate built using a council's own direct labour force, officially opened in 1903. He was connected with the Trades Union Congresses until 1895.

Parliamentary career

In 1892, he was elected as Member of Parliament for Battersea as the candidate of the Battersea Liberal Association. He displayed fervent Parliamentary opposition to the Second Boer War (1900).

Burns became well known as an independent Radical, but while fellow socialist Keir Hardie argued for the formation of a new political party, Burns remained aligned with the Liberal Party. In December 1905 Campbell-Bannerman included him in the cabinet as President of the Local Government Board, the second workingman (after Henry Broadhurst) to serve as a government minister. Burns remained proud of his working-class roots, declaring to the Commons in a speech in 1901: "I am not ashamed to say that I am the son of a washerwoman". Whilst an MP he voted in favour of the 1908 Women's Enfranchisement Bill. He received praise for his administrative policy and was retained in the government after H. H. Asquith became Prime Minister in 1908. He was sworn into the Privy Council in 1905.

In 1914 Burns was appointed President of the Board of Trade, but on 2 August 1914, just two days before Britain declared war on Germany, signalling the start of the First World War, Burns resigned from the government in protest. He played no role in the war and left parliament in 1918.

Despite his earlier radicalism, Burns adopted various positions during his time in Cabinet that placed him on the right-wing of the Liberal Party. Although supportive of the government's introduction of old-age pensions in 1908, Burns was opposed to the provision of government aid to the unemployed, arguing that no outdoor relief should be given to the poor. According to Kenneth D. Brown, Burns had long believed “that poverty and its related problems were the combined outcome of individual failure and an inadequate social environment. This was reinforced by a strong streak of puritanism which expressed itself in his opposition to smoking, drinking, and gambling." Burns had also spoken out in opposition to the gradual development of what would become known as the Welfare State, arguing in 1913 that charitable organisations and government “should not "supersede the mother, and they should not by over-attention sterilise her initiative and capacity to do what every mother should be able to do for herself."

Antisemitism
Burns has been described as an antisemite by scholars of Jewish history such as David Feldman, Colin Holmes, Robert Wistrich and Anthony Julius.

His opposition to the Second Boer War was interconnected with his personal antisemitism, making repeated references to the "trail of the financial serpent", declaring at an anti-war rally at Battersea Park in 1900 that “the South African Jew has…no bowels of compassion…every institution and class had been scheduled by the Jew as his heritage, medium and dependent. Where he could not intimidate, he corrupted; where he could not corrupt, he defamed…[the Boers] defend their land, not from a nation armed, vindicating a righteous cause, but against a militant capitalism that is using our soldiers as the uniformed brokers’ men turning out the wrong tenants in South Africa for the interests of the Jews...with wisdom foresight and kindliness, we may yet retain South Africa for the Empire and humanity, even though we may lose it for the Jews”.

Later, Burns declared in Parliament that "wherever we examine, there is the financial Jew, operating, directing, inspiring the agencies that have led to this war". Wistrich has compared this conspiratorial antisemitism to that which spread during France during the time of the Dreyfus Affair.

Burns deplored the British Army which had, in his view, been transformed from the "Sir Galahad of History" into the "janissary of the Jews". In 1902, Burns further denounced "syndicated Jews who don't fight but do know how to rob".

He remarked during a tour of the East End that "the undoing of England is within the confines of our afternoon’s journey amongst the Jews". In 1900, David Lindsay recorded Burns telling him that he believed that the "Jew is the tapeworm of civilisation".

Interests
Burns was a non-drinker and enthusiast for sporting activity. He was a long-time lover of cricket, being a regular at The Oval and Lord's, and sustained severe injuries being hit in the face by a cricket ball while watching a match in 1894.

In 1919 he was left an annuity of £1000 by Andrew Carnegie which left him financially independent and he spent the rest of his life devoted to his interests in books, London history and cricket. As a book collector, he created a very large private library, much of which he left to University of London Library. He developed an acknowledged expertise in the history of London, and in 1929, when an American compared the River Thames unfavourably with the Mississippi, he responded "The St Lawrence is water, the Mississippi is muddy water, but the Thames is liquid history".

A collection of his papers is held at the University of London library, and embraces many of his political interests, including universal adult suffrage, working hours and conditions, employment, pensions, poor laws, temperance, social conditions, local government, South African labour, and the Boer War.

He died aged 84 and was buried in St Mary's Cemetery, Battersea Rise. His connections with Battersea are recalled by the naming of a local school and a housing estate after him, as does John Burns Drive in Barking, and one of the Woolwich Ferry vessels also carried his name.

References

Sources

Further reading

 Kenneth D. Brown, "Burns, John Elliott (1858–1943)", Oxford Dictionary of National Biography (Oxford University Press, 2004) online edn, May 2010 accessed 13 Sept 2014  doi:10.1093/ref:odnb/32194

External links

 John Elliott Burns (1858–1943), Labour leader and politician in National Portrait Gallery

Liberal Party (UK) MPs for English constituencies
Liberal-Labour (UK) MPs
English trade unionists
Members of the Parliamentary Committee of the Trades Union Congress
Members of the Privy Council of the United Kingdom
Members of London County Council
Social Democratic Federation members
1858 births
1943 deaths
UK MPs 1892–1895
UK MPs 1895–1900
UK MPs 1900–1906
UK MPs 1906–1910
UK MPs 1910
UK MPs 1910–1918
English people of Scottish descent
Progressive Party (London) politicians
Members of the Fabian Society
Antisemitism in England
Presidents of the Board of Trade